You and Yours is a British radio consumer affairs programme, broadcast on BBC Radio 4 and produced by BBC News.

History
You and Yours began broadcasting in October 1970, when its first presenter was Joan York. In the 1980s it briefly ran seven days a week. In April 1998 it was increased from a 25-minute programme to 55 minutes. However, in 2014 the running time was reduced to approximately 40 minutes to make space for Radio 4's World War I drama Home Front which went out between 12.04 and 12.15. In the months when Home Front was not broadcast a different programme took its place and You and Yours continued to begin at 12.15. On 14 October 2008 there was a change of format, with two presenters being replaced by one. The breadth of topics covered was extended to global problems as well as those closer to home.

The programme continues to cover a wide range of topics, and now broadcasts on themes of medical interest as well as consumer issues. For example, on 8 May 2012, a considerable proportion of the programme was devoted to cancer care. Other medical themes that have been discussed on the programme include dementia and diabetes mellitus. The Tuesday edition of the programme takes the form of a phone-in on a consumer matter and is referred to as Call You and Yours. Winifred Robinson is the usual presenter for most of the week, with Peter White presenting the show on Fridays. Shari Vahl often works as a reporter on the show but sometimes stands in as the main presenter, while Louise Minchin also stands in as the main presenter from time to time.

On 9 January 2018, Winifred Robinson did not present the programme. The focus of this edition was fair pay for women in the aftermath of the resignation by Carrie Gracie from her post as the BBC's China Editor and her claim that the BBC was guilty of pay discrimination. Robinson had publicly given support for Ms Gracie and was replaced due to "impartiality issues". Shari Vahl presented this edition of the programme instead. It is edited by Chas Watkin and currently has a weekly audience of three and a half million. It is followed by a weather forecast which precedes The World at One.

Transmissions
You and Yours is transmitted on Mondays to Fridays at 12.04 and runs for approximately 53 minutes.

Presenters
 Winifred Robinson
 Peter White
 Louise Minchin
 Shari Vahl

Former presenters
 Chris Choi - formerly of Watchdog BBC1
 Julian Worricker (formerly of Radio Five Live)
 Carolyn Atkinson
 Liz Barclay
 Michael Collie
 John Howard (1982 to 1994, also presented Tuesday Call and The Leading Edge for Radio 5)
 Sheila McClennon
 Clare Catford (1990's)
 Diana Madill
 Ken Sykora
 Roisin McAuley (1988)
 John Waite (later presented Face the Facts)
 Tasneem Siddiqi
 Sue McGregor
 Paul Heiney (1983-5) 
 Pattie Coldwell
 Derek Cooper (1970s)
 George Luce (1970s)

Name
The name is the English idiom meaning "you and the people in your family or the people you care about."

See also
 List of BBC Radio 4 programmes
 Watchdog on BBC One

References

External links
 

1970 radio programme debuts
BBC Radio 4 programmes
Consumer protection in the United Kingdom
Radio programs about food and drink
Works about consumer protection